Madagascar is a British nature documentary series, first broadcast on BBC Two and BBC HD in February 2011. Produced by the BBC Natural History Unit and Animal Planet and narrated by David Attenborough, the three-part series focuses on the landscape and wildlife of the island of Madagascar in the Indian Ocean. Attenborough also appears briefly on camera at the beginning and end of the series. Each episode is followed by a ten-minute Madagascar Diaries segment, illustrating the techniques used to film a particular subject.

An accompanying documentary, Attenborough and the Giant Egg, was broadcast on BBC Two in March 2011. In this one-off programme, David Attenborough undertakes a personal journey back to Madagascar to investigate the fate of Aepyornis, the island's extinct elephant birds. Believed to be the largest birds which have ever lived, evidence of their existence can still be found on the island. Whilst filming Zoo Quest to Madagascar in 1961, Attenborough pieced together a complete elephant bird egg from fragments of shell collected for him.

Background

Madagascar was first announced in March 2009 as a partnership between Animal Planet and BBC Worldwide. Production duties were handled by the BBC Natural History Unit in Bristol, with Mary Summerill acting as Series Producer and Mike Gunton as Executive Producer. The production team spent 18 months in the field, travelling to some of the island's most remote corners to find and film rare species.

 One creature that was a top priority for the crew was the indri, the largest of lemurs. They were lucky enough to spend one month tracking a family group in the Minsinjo rainforest reserve. The group comprised a breeding pair with two offspring.
 In the karst landscape of the far north, known locally as tsingy, the camera team struggled to match the agility of the crowned lemurs they were trying to film. While the lemurs bounded across razor-sharp limestone shards with ease, the team laboured to set up a camera mounted on a large jib on top of the pinnacles. Only then were they able to capture the swooping wide-angle landscape shots they needed.
 One of the most remote locations was a windswept beach at Cap Sainte Marie, the island's southernmost point. Here, the producers had been told that remains of elephant bird eggs could still be found. They were amazed to discover thousands of fragments, many of which would have lain in the same place for 1,000 years or more.

Madagascar forms part of a long-running strand of blue-chip BBC nature documentaries featuring some of the planet's greatest wildlife locations. It was preceded by South Pacific in 2009 and was followed by Wild Arabia in 2013.

Episodes

References

External links
 
 Madagascar on the Eden website
 Jigsaw puzzle, video clip of David Attenborough piecing together an elephant bird egg while filming Zoo Quest.
 David Attenborough's Madagascar, 50 years of filming Madagascan wildlife.
 

BBC television documentaries
BBC high definition shows
Documentary films about nature
Nature educational television series
2011 British television series debuts
2010s British documentary television series
2011 British television series endings
Animal Planet original programming
Television series about mammals